Agouti are several rodent species of the genus Dasyprocta.

Agouti may also refer to:

Biology

Rodents
 Tailed agouti or acouchi, a member of the genus Myoprocta
 Paca, a member of the genus Cuniculus, formerly Agouti

Other
 Agouti (coloration), fur coloration in which each hair has alternating dark and light bands
 Agouti signalling peptide, a circulating hormone produced by the Agouti gene that acts like an antagonist at melanocortin receptors
 Agouti-related peptide, a neuropeptide produced in the brain by the AgRP/NPY neuron

Other uses
 Agouti (engineering), a propeller cavitation noise reduction system

See also 
 Agouta or Hispaniolan solenodon, a solenodon
 Aguti

Animal common name disambiguation pages